John Mathieson  (born 3 May 1961) is an English cinematographer and commercial director. He is one of a group of filmmakers who emerged from the music video industry of the late 1980s and 1990s. He is a frequent collaborator with director Ridley Scott, acting as director of photography on most of his films beginning with Gladiator (2000), for which he won a BAFTA Award and was nominated for an Academy Award for Best Cinematography. He has worked with directors like Joel Schumacher, Rowan Joffé, Matthew Vaughn, Guy Ritchie, James Mangold, and Rob Letterman.

Life and career 
Mathieson was born on Isle of Purbeck, Dorset, England. Beginning his career in the British film industry as camera assistant to Gabriel Beristain, Mathieson worked his way through the ranks. In 1988 he garnered recognition for the ground breaking video "Peek-a-Boo" for Siouxsie and the Banshees, directed by Peter Scammell. He collaborated with John Maybury, director of the Sinéad O'Connor video "Nothing Compares 2 U", going on to photograph Maybury's award-winning film Love Is the Devil: Study for a Portrait of Francis Bacon. Mathieson honed his craft through the 1990s shooting numerous television commercials and music videos for artists including Madonna, Prince and Massive Attack.

In the mid 1990s Mathieson photographed two feature films for director Karim Dridi, for which he was later bestowed the honour of Chevalier by the French government. He came to the attention of Tony Scott whilst shooting television commercials for the London-based company RSA Films. After working as visual effects cinematographer on Enemy of the State for Tony Scott, Mathieson photographed the film Plunkett & Macleane for Jake Scott. Having seen Mathiesons work on Plunkett, Ridley Scott invited him to work on his next project. Mathieson has photographed five films for Ridley Scott, nominated for an Academy Award for Gladiator in 2000 and won the BAFTA award for best Cinematography in the same year. His second Oscar nomination came for  The Phantom of the Opera (2004) directed by Joel Schumacher.

Despite a career now cemented in big budget film production, Mathieson maintains links with independent British film, working on more modest budget projects including Trauma directed by Marc Evans and Stoned directed by Stephen Woolley.

Mathieson acted as cinematographer on the DC Films production Batgirl. The film was cancelled in August 2022.

Personal life 
Mathieson lives in the United Kingdom, and is married to Maria Tarmander. He has earned a Knighthood of the Order of Arts and Letters for his contributions to the entertainment industry.

Filmography

Film

Television 

TV movies

Music video

References

External links
New Cinematographers by Alex Ballinger  
The Phantom of the Opera Oscar nomination
Internet Encyclopedia of Cinematographers

1961 births
Best Cinematography BAFTA Award winners
English cinematographers
Living people
People from Dorset